Jiao Ruoyu (November 7, 1915 – January 1, 2020) was a People's Republic of China politician and diplomat. He was born in Ye County, Henan. He was deputy mayor of Shenyang under Huang Oudong. He was PRC Ambassador to North Korea (1965–1970), Peru (1972–1977) and Iran (1977–1979). He was mayor of Beijing (1981–1983). On August 14, 2012, Jiao, 97, was confirmed as the oldest member of the Chinese Communist Party to attend the 18th National Congress of the Chinese Communist Party.  He celebrated his 100th birthday on November 7, 2015.

References

1915 births
2020 deaths
Ambassadors of China to Iran
Ambassadors of China to North Korea
Ambassadors of China to Peru
Chinese centenarians
Chinese Communist Party politicians from Henan
Mayors of Beijing
Mayors of Shenyang
Men centenarians
People's Republic of China politicians from Henan
Politicians from Pingdingshan